Foxford is a large village 16 km south of Ballina in County Mayo, Ireland. It stands on the N26 national primary route from Swinford to Ballina and has a railway station served by trains between Manulla Junction and Ballina.  

Foxford lies on the River Moy, a salmon-fishing river, close to Loughs Conn and Cullin and between the Nephin and Ox Mountains. The Foxford Way is an 86-km waymarked tourist trail that circles Foxford, taking in the Ox Mountains, bogland, archeological sites, lakeshores and river banks.

Agnes Bernard founded a convent and started a water-powered woollen mill here in 1892. The Foxford Woollen Mills are known for producing characteristic wool blankets.

Transport
Foxford railway station is on the Manulla Junction to Ballina line which connects to the Westport-Dublin Heuston service. The station opened on 1 May 1868. 
After being closed (against local opposition) in 1963, it was reopened in 1988. 

The N26 road passes through the town, crossing a narrow bridge over the River Moy.

Notable people

Laura Bernal (1956–2020), Argentina's ambassador to Ireland who died in office, was a regular visitor to Foxford and is buried at Craggagh Cemetery a short distance away.
Agnes Bernard (1842–1932), founder of convent, woollen mills, and a band in Foxford.
Admiral William Brown (1777–1857), founder of the Argentine Navy, hero of the Argentine War of Independence, and defender of Buenos Aires in the Cisplatine War, was born in Foxford.
F. R. Higgins (1896–1941), poet and theatre director, born in Foxford.
Mike Flanagan (1926–2014), soldier who assisted the formation of the Israeli armed forces.
Marie-Louise O'Donnell (born 1952), academic, broadcaster, politician.

See also
 List of towns and villages in Ireland

External links
Mayo on the Move: Foxford
Foxford railway station

References

Towns and villages in County Mayo